is a Japanese actor and voice actor. He is the best known dubbing roles as Bruce Banner / Hulk (played by Mark Ruffalo) in the Marvel Cinematic Universe.

Filmography

Film
 MUSASHI (1996) (Miyamoto Musashi)
 Samurai Resurrection (2003) (Tokugawa Iemitsu)

Television drama
 Yoshitsune (2005) (Satō Tsugunobu)
 Kitaro ga Mita Gyokusai - Mizuki Shigeru no Senso (2007) (Mizumoto)
 Saka no Ue no Kumo (2009) (Shigeta Fujii)
 Bloody Monday (2010) (Taneda)
 GeGeGe no Nyōbō (2010) (Company commander)
 Yae no Sakura (2013) (Miyabe Teizō)

Television animation
 Detective Conan (2001) (Takeichi Tonomura)
 Darker than Black (2007) (Richard Lau)
 Kekkaishi (2007) (Masamori Sumimura)
 Yakushiji Ryōko no Kaiki Jikenbo (2008) (Mishiba)
 Battle Spirits: Shounen Toppa Bashin (2009) (Leon)
 Eden of the East (2009) (Daiju Mononobe)
 Night Raid 1931 (2010) (Kuse)
 SD Gundam Sangokuden Brave Battle Warriors (2010) (Lu Bu Tallgeese)
 The Tatami Galaxy (2010) (Ramen stall owner)
 Nura: Rise of the Yokai Clan (2011) (Akagappa)
 Code:Breaker (2012) (Abe)
 Eureka Seven: AO (2012) (Soga)
 Lupin the Third: The Woman Called Fujiko Mine (2012) (Hijacker A)
 The Prince of Tennis (2012) (Nyūdō Mifune)
 Yu-Gi-Oh! Arc-V (2014) (Strong Ishijima)
 Snow White with the Red Hair (2016) (The King)
 One Piece (Vinsmoke Niji) (2017)
 Boogiepop and Others (Shinpei Kuroda (2019)
 JoJo's Bizarre Adventure: Golden Wind (Cioccolata) (2019)
 Argonavis from BanG Dream! (Kenzō Hakkōda) (2020)
 Sorcerous Stabber Orphen: Battle of Kimluck (Pope Ramonirok) (2021)
 Megalobox 2: Nomad (Mack) (2021)
 Lupin the 3rd Part 6 (Colonel Daidoji) (2021)
 Helck (Rafaed) (2023)

Theatrical animation
 Eden of the East: The King of Eden (2009) (Daiju Mononobe)
 Eden of the East: Paradise Lost (2010) (Daiju Mononobe)
 Ghost in the Shell: Arise (2013) (Mamuro)
 Ghost in the Shell: The Movie (2015) (Mamuro)
 Mobile Suit Gundam: Cucuruz Doan's Island (2022) (Egba Atler)

ONA
 Bastard!! -Heavy Metal, Dark Fantasy-: Eddie the Lich (2022)

OVA
 Mobile Suit Gundam Unicorn (2010) (Norm Basilicock)
Hanayaka Nari, Waga Ichizoku: Kinetograph (2012) (Tadashi Miyanomori)

Video games
 Ni no Kuni: Sindbah (Zerugasu)
 Granblue Fantasy: Vice Admiral Gandharva
 Time Travelers：Sōma Kamiya
 Shin Megami Tensei IV: Apocalypse: Odin
 Dynasty Warriors 8: Xtreme Legends：Yu Jin
 Dynasty Warriors 9: Yu Jin
 League of Legends：Yone
 Warriors Orochi 4: Yu Jin
 Shin Megami Tensei V: Odin
 Stranger of Paradise: Final Fantasy Origin: Ash

Dubbing roles

Live-action
Mark Ruffalo
 The Avengers (Bruce Banner / The Hulk)
 Iron Man 3 (Bruce Banner)
 Now You See Me (Dylan Rhodes)
 Avengers: Age of Ultron (Bruce Banner / The Hulk)
 Spotlight (Michael Rezendes)
 Now You See Me 2 (Dylan Rhodes)
 Thor: Ragnarok (Bruce Banner / The Hulk)
 Avengers: Infinity War (Bruce Banner / The Hulk)
 Avengers: Endgame (Bruce Banner / The Hulk)
 Shang-Chi and the Legend of the Ten Rings (Bruce Banner)
 The Adam Project (Louis Reed)
Christian Bale
 American Hustle (Irving Rosenfeld)
 Exodus: Gods and Kings (Moses)
 The Big Short (Michael Burry)
 Hostiles (Captain Joseph J. Blocker)
 Vice (Dick Cheney)
 Mowgli: Legend of the Jungle (Bagheera)
 Ford v Ferrari (Ken Miles)
Karl Urban
 The Chronicles of Riddick (Lord Vaako)
 Star Trek (Leonard McCoy)
 Almost Human (Detective John Kennex)
 Riddick (Siberius Vaako)
 Star Trek Into Darkness (Leonard McCoy)
 Pete's Dragon (Gavin)
 Star Trek Beyond (Leonard McCoy)
Tom Hardy
 Lawless (Forrest Bondurant)
 The Drop (Bob Saginowski)
 Child 44 (Leo Demidov)
 Mad Max: Fury Road (2019 THE CINEMA edition) (Max Rockatansky)
 Dunkirk (Farrier)
 12 Years a Slave (Edwin Epps (Michael Fassbender))
 Agatha Christie's Poirot (George Abernethie (Michael Fassbender))
 Agora (Ammonius (Ashraf Barhom))
 Aladdin (Hakim (Numan Acar))
 Angel Has Fallen (Mike Banning (Gerard Butler))
 The Art of Getting By (Dustin Mason (Michael Angarano))
 Bad Country (Bud Carter (Willem Dafoe))
 The Blacklist (Donald Ressler (Diego Klattenhoff))
 Boardwalk Empire (Nelson Van Alden (Michael Shannon))
 The Bourne Legacy (Vendel (Corey Stoll))
 The Bridge (Steven Linder (Thomas M. Wright))
 Burn Notice (Nate Westen (Seth Peterson))
 Captain America: The First Avenger (James Montgomery Falsworth (JJ Feild))
 Captain Phillips (Commander Frank Castellano (Yul Vazquez))
 Contagion (Alan Krumwiede (Jude Law))
 CSI: Miami (Jesse Cardoza (Eddie Cibrian))
 Dawn of the Planet of the Apes (Malcolm (Jason Clarke))
 Extant (Dr. John Woods (Goran Višnjić))
 The Fortress (Lee Shi-baek (Park Hee-soon))
 A Good Day to Die Hard (Mike Collins (Cole Hauser))
 Good Night, and Good Luck (Joseph Wershba (Robert Downey Jr.))
 The Gray Man (Laszlo Sosa (Wagner Moura))
 The Great Wall (Pedro Tovar (Pedro Pascal))
 Greenland (John Garrity (Gerard Butler))
 Gulliver's Travels (Horatio (Jason Segel))
 The Hateful Eight (Joe Gage / Grouch Douglas (Michael Madsen))
 Hearts Beat Loud (Frank Fisher (Nick Offerman))
 Hitman: Agent 47 (Antoine Le Clerq (Thomas Kretschmann))
 The Hollars (John Hollar (John Krasinski))
 Hustle (Michael Stone (Adrian Lester))
 I Feel Pretty (Ethan (Rory Scovel))
 Imagine Me & You (Cooper "Coop" (Darren Boyd))
 Imposters (Patrick (Stephen Bishop))
 Inkheart (Mortimer "Mo" Folchart (Brendan Fraser))
 Intelligence (Gabriel Vaughn (Josh Holloway))
 iZombie (Ravi Chakrabarti (Rahul Kohli))
 John Carter (John Carter (Taylor Kitsch))
 Jungle Cruise (Aguirre (Édgar Ramírez))
 King Kong (Captain Englehorn (Thomas Kretschmann))
 Last Knights (Emperor (Peyman Moaadi))
 London Has Fallen (Mike Banning (Gerard Butler))
 The Many Saints of Newark (Johnny Soprano (Jon Bernthal))
 Mission: Impossible – Ghost Protocol (Marius Wistrom (Samuli Edelmann))
 New Heart (Choi Kang-guk (Cho Jae-hyun))
 The Nutcracker and the Four Realms (Benjamin Stahlbaum (Matthew Macfadyen))
 Olympus Has Fallen (Mike Banning (Gerard Butler))
 Om Shanti Om (Om Prakash Makhija / Om Kapoor (Shah Rukh Khan))
 One Missed Call (Detective Jack Andrews (Edward Burns))
 Paul, Apostle of Christ (Luke (Jim Caviezel))
 The Perfect Guy (Carter Duncan / Robert Adams (Michael Ealy))
 Premium Rush (Bobby Monday (Michael Shannon))
 The Promise (Kunlun (Jang Dong-gun))
 Ra.One (Shekhar / G. One (Shah Rukh Khan))
 The Raven (Inspector Emmett Fields (Luke Evans))
 The Recall ("The Hunter" (Wesley Snipes))
 Riddick (Santana (Jordi Mollà))
 Sand Castle (Staff Sergeant Harper (Logan Marshall-Green))
 SEAL Team 8: Behind Enemy Lines (Case (Lex Shrapnel))
 Seeking Justice (Simon/Eugene Cook (Guy Pearce))
 Shot Caller (Jacob "Money" Harlon (Nikolaj Coster-Waldau))
 The Stand (Stu Redman (James Marsden))
 Suicide Squad (Colonel Rick Flag (Joel Kinnaman))
 The Suicide Squad (Rick Flag (Joel Kinnaman))
 Taking Lives (Joseph Paquette (Olivier Martinez))
 Taxi Driver (2007 DVD edition) (Travis Bickle (Robert De Niro))
 Terminator Salvation (Barnes (Common))
 This Is Us (Jack Pearson (Milo Ventimiglia))
 Train to Busan (Homeless Man (Choi Gwi-hwa))
 Transformers: Revenge of the Fallen (Graham (Matthew Marsden))
 Transformers: Dark of the Moon (Neil Armstrong (Don Jeanes))
 Top Gun (2005 NTV edition) (Lt. Bill "Cougar" Cortell (John Stockwell))
 The Veil (Jim Jacobs (Thomas Jane))
 Vice (Roy (Thomas Jane))
 V.I.P. (Park Jae-hyuk (Jang Dong-gun))
 White House Down (Emil Stenz (Jason Clarke))
 Winchester (Eric Price (Jason Clarke))

Animation
 The Little Prince (The Young Aviator)
 Sinbad: Legend of the Seven Seas (Proteus)
 What If...? (Hulk / Bruce Banner)

References

External links
 Official agency profile 
 

1969 births
Living people
Japanese male film actors
Japanese male television actors
Japanese male video game actors
Japanese male voice actors
Male voice actors from Saitama Prefecture
20th-century Japanese male actors
21st-century Japanese male actors